The Association for Rational Emotive Behaviour Therapy (AREBT) was established in 1993 by a group of counsellors, psychotherapists and psychologists who were training as Rational Emotive Behaviour Therapy (REBT) practitioners in the United Kingdom.

Professional recognition of practitioners 
AREBT recognises professional qualifications that lead to membership of the organisation. It accredits Rational Emotive Behaviour Therapy practitioners as therapists, supervisors, coaches and trainers. In 2008 the Association jointly created the National Rational Emotive Behaviour and Cognitive Behaviour Therapy register of accredited practitioners with British Association for Behavioural and Cognitive Psychotherapies (BABCP).

Accredited members of AREBT and the BABCP could join the register. This register is a means of verifying CBT Practitioner Accreditation.

References 

Psychology organisations based in the United Kingdom